Jean-Claude Suares (March 30, 1942 – July 30, 2013) was an artist, illustrator, editor, and creative consultant to many publications, and the first Op-Ed page art director at The New York Times.

Biography
Suares was born on March 30, 1942, in Alexandria, Egypt, to a Sephardic father. He and his family moved from Egypt to Italy when he was a teenager. Later, he moved to New York City, where he briefly attended Pratt Institute. In the 1960s, he joined the U.S. Army paratroopers and was sent to Vietnam, where he worked on staff for Stars and Stripes. He also spoke several languages. In 1973, Suares arranged an exhibition of Op-Ed art at the Musée des Arts Décoratifs in Paris. For over 30 years his comic drawings appeared in The New York Times, on the covers of The New Yorker and The Atlantic Monthly, and in other periodicals and books. He wrote, edited or designed scores of illustrated books. He was also involved in book publishing. He worked with Jacqueline Kennedy Onassis at Doubleday. He also designed Michael Jackson’s autobiography, Moonwalk. Suares was in one movie in 1973, It Happened in Hollywood.

A resident of Harrington Park, New Jersey, Suares died on July 30, 2013, at Englewood Hospital and Medical Center in Englewood, New Jersey as a result of a bacterial infection. He was 71 and is survived by his wife of 33 years Nina Duran, and a sister.

Magazines worked on
 Changes 
 Discover 
 WWII Magazine 
 Columbia College Today
 Connoisseur Magazine 
 Armchair General Magazine
 Northeast Luxury Homes
 Men's Health
 Fit Pregnancy 
 New York Magazine
 POZ
 JCK Luxury
 Buzz
 Walking 
 MAMM  
 Scanlan's Monthly
 7 päivää
 The New York Times Book Review
 Wild West
 The Magazine of American History
 Aviation History
 Inc.
 Fast Company
 Variety
 Publishers Weekly
 Broadcasting & Cable
 Military History Monthly
 The Atlantic Monthly
 The New Yorker

Not a complete list.

Books worked on

 Sexy Dogs
 Women of Iron: the world of female bodybuilders 
 Fat Cats 
 Cool Mutts 
 Alien creatures
 Great Cats: The Who's Who of Famous Felines 
 Funny Babies
 Funny Dogs: Postcard Book
 Funny Puppies 
 Funny Kittens 
 American Anthem 
 Cool Cats 
 The Photographed Cat 
 Hollywood Heavies 
 Hollywood Cats 
 Hollywood Christmas 
 Hollywood Doctors 
 Hollywood Weddings
 Hollywood Trains 
 Hollywood Kids 
 Hollywood Weddings  
 The Literary Dog
 Passion for Roses 
 Flight: a poster book 
 The Illustrated Cat: a poster book 
 Socks Goes to Washington: The Diary of America's First Cat
 City Dogs
 The Illustrated Flower 
 Rocketship: An Incredible Voyage Through Science Fiction and Science Fact
 Black & White Dogs 
 A Passion for Kittens 
 The Snoopy Collection 
 Crash Helmet
 The Nutty Joke Book 
 Washington, D.C. 
 The Rough 
 Gruff Goat Brothers Rap 
 Dog Box 24 Assorted Notecards and Envelopes 
 Better Times: the indispensable guide to beating hard times 
 Real Clothes 
 The Big Book of Babies 
 The Big Book of Horses 
 The Big Book of Dogs 
 The Big Book of Cats

Not a complete list.

References

External links
 Askart.com entry
Official Website
Suares Books

1942 births
2013 deaths
American art directors
American editorial cartoonists
American editors
American graphic designers
American illustrators
Infectious disease deaths in New Jersey
United States Army personnel of the Vietnam War
The New York Times people
People from Harrington Park, New Jersey
Artists from New York City
Pratt Institute alumni
United States Army soldiers